Tyrol or Tirol is a historical region in the Eastern Alps, divided since 1919 into Western Austria and Northern Italy.

It consists of:
Tyrol (state), a state in Western Austria
East Tyrol, part of the Austrian state of Tyrol
North Tyrol, part of the Austrian state of Tyrol
South Tyrol (Alto Adige), a province of Northern Italy
Tyrol–South Tyrol–Trentino Euroregion, a European Union designated entity comprising the whole border region

 Tyrol Castle, in the municipality of Tirol, seat of the Counts of Tyrol, is the origin of the name

Historical
History of Tyrol
County of Tyrol, a former political entity in existence until the early 20th century comprising territory in the Italian region of Trentino-Alto Adige/Südtirol and the Austrian state of Tyrol
German Tyrol, the German-speaking area of the old County of Tyrol

Others
Tyrolean (disambiguation)
Tirol, a village in Doclin Commune, Caraş-Severin County, Romania
Tyrol Basin, a ski and snowboard area located in Mount Horeb, Wisconsin, USA
Tyrol Valley, a high ice-free valley in the Asgard Range, Victoria Land, Antarctica
Tyrolerfjord, in Greenland
Galen Tyrol, a fictional character from the re-imagined miniseries and television series Battlestar Galactica
Tirol (fictional planet), the homeworld of the Robotech Masters in the anime series Robotech
Tirol (horse), an Irish-bred, British-trained Thoroughbred racehorse and sire
Dimitrije Tirol, a Serbian writer, linguist, geographer, and painter